Kaddish is the second feature film directed by Konstantin Fam. Like Konstantin’s previous work, this film is dedicated to the memory of the victims of the Holocaust.

Plot 
The testament of a former concentration camp prisoner confronts and turns the lives of two young people from different worlds around, shedding light on the tragic history of their family.

Cast 
 Lenn Kudrjawizki – Leonid
 Masha King – Rachel
 Vladimir Koshevoi  – Leo
 Mikhail Gorevoy – Richard
 Vyacheslav Chepurchenko – Kurt
 Anzhelika Kashirina – Katya
 Alim Kandur – Shlomo
 Vyacheslav Ganenko – Moshe

Production 
The film was shot with Russian-Belarusian co-production with the participation of Sasha Klein Production (Israel). The filming took place in Moscow, New York, Prague, Brest, Minsk and ended in Israel.

The film was created with the financial support of the Ministry for Culture of Russia, as well as private philanthropists.

Confession 
Film premiered as part of the competition program of the 1st ECG Film Festival in London in June 2019, where film got Grand Prix. The film is also a contender for the Golden Globe in the category "Best Foreign Film". Konstantin Fam also got into the longlist of the Golden Eagle Award of the National Academy of Motion Pictures Arts and Sciences of Russia for 2019 in the category "Best Director". The film "Kaddish" was also considered by the Oscar Committee of Belarus, but was not selected.

Accolades

Awards 
 1st ECG Film Festival in London, Grand Prix
 Amur Autumn Film Festival, Blagoveshchensk, Russia - 2019, Best Screenplay, Media Selection
 Sochi International Film Festival and Awards (Russia) 2019, Best Music

Official partners 
 Federation of Jewish Communities of Russia
 Russian Jewish Congress
 Chabad Odessa

References

External links 
 

Holocaust films
Russian epic films
Russian war drama films
2010s Russian-language films
War epic films
Epic films based on actual events
Rescue of Jews during the Holocaust
2010s war drama films